In enzymology, a mandelamide amidase is an enzyme that catalyzes the chemical reaction

(R)-mandelamide + H2O  (R)-mandelate + NH3

Thus, the two substrates of this enzyme are (R)-mandelamide and H2O, whereas its two products are (R)-mandelate and NH3.

This enzyme belongs to the family of hydrolases, those acting on carbon-nitrogen bonds other than peptide bonds, specifically in linear amides.  The systematic name of this enzyme class is mandelamide hydrolase. This enzyme is also called Pseudomonas mandelamide hydrolase.

References

 

EC 3.5.1
Enzymes of unknown structure